Lockyer Creek Railway Bridge (Murphys Creek) is a heritage-listed railway bridge on the Toowoomba–Helidon line over Lockyer Creek at Murphys Creek, Lockyer Valley Region, Queensland, Australia. It was added to the Queensland Heritage Register on 21 October 1992.

History 
The railway opened for traffic between Helidon and Toowoomba on 1 May 1867. From the 1870s there has been a continuing process of improving the Main Line between Brisbane and Toowoomba because of its importance as a major arterial route. Design of the innovative bridge was completed and signed by Chief Engineer, William Pagan on 31 March 1910. The bridge and deviation were completed and brought into use on 21 December 1911.

Description 
A concrete arch bridge aligned on a straight alignment and carrying a single track on a ballasted deck. Its spans are:
 2x reinforced concrete arches, concrete abutment, common concrete piers
 1x reinforced concrete arch supporting 2x and  reinforced concrete spandrel arches, common concrete piers
 1x reinforced concrete arch supporting 2x and 2x reinforced concrete spandrel arches, common concrete piers
 1x reinforced concrete arch supporting 1xand  reinforced concrete spandrel arches, common concrete piers
 3x reinforced concrete arches, common concrete piers, concrete abutment

The spandrel columns are arranged in pairs, one for each arch rib, with crossbracing in concrete. The arch ribs are parabolic of rectangular section. There is a concrete balustrade. The whole structure is in cast-in-situ concrete.

Heritage listing 
Lockyer Creek Railway Bridge was listed on the Queensland Heritage Register on 21 October 1992 having satisfied the following criteria.

The place is important in demonstrating the evolution or pattern of Queensland's history.

This reinforced concrete arched bridge on a straight alignment has one of the largest spans of its type in Australia.

The place is important because of its aesthetic significance.

It has an innovative and aesthetically pleasing design.

The place is important in demonstrating a high degree of creative or technical achievement at a particular period.

This reinforced concrete arched bridge on a straight alignment has one of the largest spans of its type in Australia.

The place has a special association with the life or work of a particular person, group or organisation of importance in Queensland's history.

Its innovative and aesthetically pleasing design was associated with the Chief Engineer, William Pagan.

See also
 Lockyer Creek Railway Bridge (Clarendon)
 Lockyer Creek Railway Bridge (Lockyer)

References

Attribution

External links 

Queensland Heritage Register
Murphys Creek, Queensland
Railway bridges in Queensland
Articles incorporating text from the Queensland Heritage Register
Bridges completed in 1911
1911 establishments in Australia
Main Line railway, Queensland